The Malayan water shrew (Chimarrogale hantu), also known as the hantu water shrew, is a red-toothed shrew recorded only from the Malaysian state of Selangor. It was listed as a critically endangered, but is now considered near threatened.

It gets its scientific name hantu from the Malay word for ghost.

Anatomy
The Malayan water shrew has a white underside, a black coat along its top and sides and a fringe of bristles running along the surface of the tail and on the paws which act as swimming aids. The teeth have red tips.

Habitat
The Malayan water shrew lives in the Tropical Rainforests of Peninsula Malaysia. It lives mainly by fresh water lakes and rivers surrounded by vegetation and spends much of its time underwater. Underwater this shrew likes to stay in leafy areas to avoid predators and surprise its prey, which include fish, frogs and plants.

References

External links
 
 

Chimarrogale
Endemic fauna of Malaysia
Endemic fauna of Selangor
Mammals of Malaysia
EDGE species
Mammals described in 1958